Richard Pattison (born in 1975) is a climber from Northumberland in Great Britain, who resides in Sydney, Australia. He became well known in Northumberland after summitting Everest in 2009, which created front page headlines in the local newspaper "The Journal". The Everest summit also attracted further media attention from BBC Look-North, BBC Radio Newcastle and marketing for the Northumberland County Council. He writes a blog on "The Journal" website.
He is working with Melisa Ang as a consultant and claims that she is his biggest inspiration.

Everest
Richard Pattison climbed Everest on a commercial expedition organised by Summitclimb via the South Col route from Nepal. The team summitted on 19 May 2009. He said of Everest:

Climbing is my passion, I realised my life time dream in the Himalayas when I stood on top of the world. I summitted Everest on 19 May 2009, it had been a long journey, slowly building up experience, skills and the mental toughness required to attempt such a great challenge. My summit day on Everest defines my life, no matter what I do in the future, I will never move beyond or past Everest.

7 Summits
The 7 Summits are the highest mountains of each of the seven continents. Richard Pattison completed the quest after climbing Everest in 2009, but the most notable was the adventurous new route on Vinson in Antarctica as part of an Australian exploratory expedition to the Dater glacier.

Dates climbed:

He is the 27th Briton to complete the 7 Summits, and the 6th Australian.

Other notable climbs
Mont Blanc in 2000 - 4,807m
Shishapangma in 2003 - 8,008m
Matterhorn in 2009 - 4,478m
Baruntse in 2009 - 7,120m
Mera Peak in 2009 - 6,560m
Island Peak in 2009 - 6,120m
Pokalde in 2009 - 5,806m
Ama Dablam in 2011 - 6,812m
Lobuche East in 2011 - 6,119m
Parchermo in 2011 - 6,273m
Yalung Ri in 2011 - 5,630m

References 

English mountain climbers
Living people
1975 births
People from Ashington